Bridgeport is an unincorporated community in Polk County, Oregon, United States.

References

Unincorporated communities in Polk County, Oregon
Unincorporated communities in Oregon